The Weeping Wall is a set of cliffs, approximately 1000 feet high, located at the western base of Cirrus Mountain alongside Highway 93 (Icefields Parkway) in northern Banff National Park in Alberta, Canada, just south of the boundary with Jasper National Park.

In spring and summer, the faces of the cliffs are usually covered with a series of cascading waterfalls. In winter, the waterfalls freeze into towering pillars of ice and become a well-known site for ice climbing.

References

External links 
"Weeping Wall" at Canadian Rockies Ice Climbing Encyclopedia with route descriptions, degrees of difficulty, and equipment needs.

Mountains of Banff National Park
One-thousanders of Alberta
Climbing areas of Canada
Waterfalls of Alberta